Noel Toy (born Ngum Yee Hom; December 27, 1918 – December 24, 2003) was an American burlesque performer famous for her fan dance and bubble dance, initially at the Forbidden City nightclub in San Francisco, California.  Later, she acted in films and on television.

Early years and career
Toy was born in San Francisco, California. She was the first of eight children born to parents who immigrated from Canton, China. Toy's parents opened a laundry in Inverness, California, where they were the only Chinese residents. Toy, who was then nicknamed "Emma", was living in 1930 with her parents (Hom Gin "Gin"; Mah "Marion" Shee) and five of her ultimately seven siblings in Point Reyes Station, Marin, California, USA

She performed her routines at the Stork Club and other venues in New York City, before returning to San Francisco, where she was most famous at the Forbidden City nightclub.  In her later years, Toy had many small parts in films and television, including a role in Big Trouble in Little China and frequent portrayals of Korean villagers in M*A*S*H.

Personal life
Toy met a soldier and actor named Carleton Young in 1945, who became enamored with the dancer after seeing her perform at Latin Quarter nightclub in New York. Their engagement was announced in June 1945, however it was called off a few weeks later.  Nevertheless, they obtained a marriage license on 19 December 1945 in Manhattan; and married the next day on December 20, 1945, in New York City. They remained married until her husband's death in 1994. They had no children.

Filmography

References

External links 

 

Chinese-American culture in San Francisco
1918 births
2003 deaths
American people of Chinese descent
American burlesque performers
Burials at Hollywood Forever Cemetery
Actresses from San Francisco
People from Inverness, California
20th-century American women
21st-century American women